Matter of Fact with Soledad O'Brien is a weekly American public-affairs television talk program hosted by journalist Soledad O'Brien. The show is produced by Hearst Media Production Group and is distributed to TV stations in national broadcast television syndication by Sony Pictures Television. It airs on TV stations around the country in weekend program slots, primarily in the Sunday morning talk program block. It also airs on a one-week-after-broadcast basis on fyi.

"Matter of Fact" was originally launched in November 2015 and was hosted by entrepreneur and political commentator Fernando Espuelas. Beginning with the 2016-2017 TV season, O'Brien succeeded Espuelas in the hosting role.

A September 2017 "Matter of Fact" special, hosted by O'Brien, aired in prime-time on stations including WCVB-TV in Boston, WESH-TV in Orlando, and WTAE-TV in Pittsburgh, addressing the nationwide opioid-abuse crisis.

In April 2018 it was announced that the program had been renewed for the 2018-2019 TV season, and that new agreements with multiple station groups had expanded the show's audience reach to 90% of U.S. TV households.

In January 2020 the show was recognized by the National Association of Television Program Executives (NATPE) with a NATPE Iris Award of Excellence.

In October 2020 O'Brien and the "Matter of Fact" producers launched a "listening tour" on race and justice with a 75-minute digital special, "The Hard Truth About Bias: Images and Reality," which streamed across the digital platforms of many of Hearst's consumer media brands, including television stations, newspapers, various magazines and on Matter of Fact's website, YouTube and Facebook Live channels.  This was followed in March 2021 with a 90-minute digital presentation, "To Be An American: Identity, Race And Justice."  Both productions featured guests from the fields of entertainment, journalism and academia, among others.

References 

2015 American television series debuts
2010s American television news shows
2020s American television news shows
2010s American television talk shows
2020s American television talk shows
English-language television shows
First-run syndicated television programs in the United States
American Sunday morning talk shows
Television series by Sony Pictures Television